Emporia is an unincorporated community in Adams Township, Madison County, Indiana.

Geography
Large grain elevators operated by Kokomo Grain Co. are the community's most prominent landmark.

History
Emporia was founded in 1891 when the railroad was extended to that point. A post office was established at Emporia in 1892, and remained in operation until it was discontinued in 1907.

References

Unincorporated communities in Madison County, Indiana
Unincorporated communities in Indiana
Indianapolis metropolitan area